Stenoptilodes huanacoicus is a moth of the family Pterophoridae that is known from Peru.

Adults are on wing in February.

External links

huanacoicus
Moths described in 1996
Endemic fauna of Peru
Moths of South America